Offranville is a commune in the Seine-Maritime department in the Normandy region in north-western France.

Geography
The river Scie forms most of the commune's eastern border with Saint-Aubin-sur-Scie.

Heraldry

Population

People
Jacques-Émile Blanche (1861–1942), artist, lived and died here.

Places of interest
 The church of St.Ouen, dating from the sixteenth century, with a twisted spire.
 A 1000-year-old yew tree, 7 metres (23 feet) in circumference.
 Three châteaux and their parks.
 The Jacques-Émile Blanche museum.

Twin towns
  Thurmaston, Leicestershire, United Kingdom

See also
Communes of the Seine-Maritime department

References

External links

Official website of Offranville 

Communes of Seine-Maritime